The Colourful Life is the only studio album by British indie rock band Cajun Dance Party, recorded whilst studying for their A-Levels.

The band released the song "The Hill, The View & The Lights" the only song on the album to feature Vicky Freund on vocals, as a free download from their website to promote the album.

The opening track was featured in an episode of the BBC Three sitcom Gavin and Stacey in the third series.

Track listing

"Colourful Life"
"The Race"
"Time Falls"
"The Next Untouchable"
"No Joanna"
"Amylase"
"The Firework"
"Buttercups"
"The Hill, The View & The Lights"
"Yesterday I Lost My Heart" (Japanese Bonus Track)
"The Parachute" (Japanese Bonus Track)

References

2008 debut albums
Cajun Dance Party albums
XL Recordings albums
Albums produced by Bernard Butler